Bad Boys is the debut album by Canadian band Haywire that was released in 1986.

Track listing

Personnel
 Paul MacAusland - vocals
 David Rashed - keyboards and backing vocals
 Marvin Birt - guitars and backing vocals
 Ronnie Switzer - bass
 Sean Kilbride - drums

Additional musicians
 Ron LeBlanc - drums on "Crazy", "Girl in Love", "Out of My Head"

External links
 Bad Boys lyrics

1986 debut albums
Haywire (band) albums
Attic Records albums
Albums recorded at Metalworks Studios